JTEKT Corporation  is a Japanese corporation created in January 2006 upon the merger of two companies: Koyo Seiko Co. and Toyoda Machine Works.

Toyoda Machine Works, Machine tool sales for North, Central and South America, aftermarket support services, machine re-manufacturing and engineering services supplied by Jtekt Toyoda Americas Corporation  H.Q. Arlington Heights, Illinois and the Re-manufactured Products Division operate out of Wixom, Michigan, with support offices in Monterrey, Mexico and Itu, Brazil.  JTEKT Corporation machine tools are manufactured in Japan by the JTEKT Corporation, and in Taiwan, by WELE Mechatronics, a "Toyoda Strategic Alliance Company", and exported globally.

Business Areas 
 Bearings (KOYO)
 Driveline Components (JTEKT)
 Machine Tools (TOYODA, WELE MECHATRONICS)
 Steering Products (JTEKT)

JTEKT North America 
JTEKT North America is a separate legal entity headed by COO Gary Bourque who reports to the CEO (Keita Mizuno). There are several locations of operations throughout the United States, Canada, and Mexico.

In 2009, JTEKT NA purchased the needle bearing business (automotive bearings) from Timken. The needle roller bearing business was a part of the Torrington Company which Timken purchased in 2003. JTEKT gained five manufacturing locations along with a technical center and a business office in North America, as well as eight other locations worldwide.

Headquarters
 JTEKT - A-TEC in Plymouth, MI
 Koyo - Industrial Sales in Westlake, OH and Automotive in Greenville, SC
 Toyoda Machinery - in Arlington Heights, IL

Technical Centers
 JTEKT - A-TEC in Plymouth, MI
 Koyo - GTC in Greenville, SC
 Jtekt Toyoda Americas COrp. - Northeast Tech Center in Shrewsbury, MA Upper Midwest Tech Center in New Brighton, MN West Coast Tech Center Placentia, CA Mexico sales office Monterrey, Mexico Brazil Tech center Itu, São Paulo, Brazil.

Manufacturing Locations

 JATM - Steering/Driveline Plant in Morristown, TN
 JATV - Steering Plant in Vonore, TN
 JATX - Steering Plant in Ennis, TX
 JASC - Driveline Plant in Piedmont, SC
 Koyo Washington - Taper Roller Bearing Plant in Telford, TN
 Koyo Richland - Wheel Hub Bearing Plant in Blythewood, SC
 Koyo Orangeburg - Taper Roller Bearing in Orangeburg, SC
 Walhalla (Classic Torrington) - Thrust Bearing Plant in Walhalla, SC
 Cairo (Classic Torrington) - Bearings in Cairo, GA
 Sylvania (Classic Torrington) - Drawn Cup Bearings in Sylvania, GA
 Dahlonega (Classic Torrington) - Loose Needle Rollers in Dahlonega, GA
 Bedford (Classic Torrington) - Planet Shafts in Bedford, Quebec
 Koyo Canada Inc. (Classic Torrington) Canadian Warehouse and Operations Burlington, Ontario

References

External links 
 

Automotive companies of Japan
Defense companies of Japan
Robotics companies of Japan
Toyota Group
Manufacturing companies based in Osaka
Manufacturing companies established in 2006
Vehicle manufacturing companies established in 2006
Japanese companies established in 2006
Companies based in Osaka
Companies listed on the Tokyo Stock Exchange
Japanese brands